José Luis Molina (born 8 March 1965) is a Costa Rican long-distance runner. He competed in the men's marathon at the 1996 Summer Olympics and the 2000 Summer Olympics.

References

1965 births
Living people
Athletes (track and field) at the 1992 Summer Olympics
Athletes (track and field) at the 1996 Summer Olympics
Athletes (track and field) at the 2000 Summer Olympics
Costa Rican male long-distance runners
Costa Rican male marathon runners
Olympic athletes of Costa Rica
Athletes (track and field) at the 1991 Pan American Games
Pan American Games competitors for Costa Rica
Place of birth missing (living people)
20th-century Costa Rican people
21st-century Costa Rican people